Turridrupa bijubata, common name the crested turrid, is a species of sea snail, a marine gastropod mollusk in the family Clavatulidae.

Description
The size of an adult shell varies between 11 mm and 25 mm. The color of the shell is chocolate-brown, encircled by narrow, lighter-colored keels The second keel, which is somewhat stronger than the others, is often broken up into small tubercles. The interior of the aperture is chocolate-colored. The siphonal canal is short. It is distinguished from Turridrupa cincta (Lamarck, 1822) by its narrower form, a longer spire, sharper ridges and a darker color.

The sinus apex is situated at end of the mid-shoulder cord. The cords are smooth with a buff color on dark brown ground.

Distribution
This marine species has a wide distribution : off Mozambique, Madagascar to Japan, the Fiji Islands and Australia. (Queensland)

References

 Reeve, L.A. 1843. Monograph of the genus Pleurotoma. pls 1–18 in Reeve, L.A. (ed.). Conchologica Iconica. London : L. Reeve & Co. Vol. 1.
 Schmeltz, J.D.K. 1869. Museum Godeffroy. Catalog 4. Hamburg : Wilhelm Mauke Söhne xxxix 141 pp.
 Bouge, L.J. & Dautzenberg, P.L. 1914. Les Pleurotomides de la Nouvelle-Caledonie et de ses dependances. Journal de Conchyliologie 61: 123-214 
 Hedley, C. 1922. A revision of the Australian Turridae. Records of the Australian Museum 13(6): 213–359, pls 42-56
 Dautzenberg, Ph. (1929). Mollusques testacés marins de Madagascar. Faune des Colonies Francaises, Tome III
 Habe, T. 1964. Shells of the Western Pacific in color. Osaka : Hoikusha Vol. 2 233 pp., 66 pls. 
 Powell, A.W.B. 1967. The family Turridae in the Indo-Pacific. Part 1a. The Turrinae concluded. Indo-Pacific Mollusca 1(7): 409–443, pls 298-317
 Cernohorsky, W.O. 1978. Tropical Pacific Marine Shells. Sydney : Pacific Publications 352 pp., 68 pls. 
 Kay, E.A. 1979. Hawaiian Marine Shells. Reef and shore fauna of Hawaii. Section 4 : Mollusca. Honolulu, Hawaii : Bishop Museum Press Bernice P. Bishop Museum Special Publication Vol. 64(4) 653 pp.
 Wilson, B. 1994. Australian Marine Shells. Prosobranch Gastropods. Kallaroo, WA : Odyssey Publishing Vol. 2 370 pp.

External links
 

bijubata